| tries = {{#expr:
 2 + 4 + 5 + 3 + 7 + 6
 + 5 + 7 + 11 + 10 + 5 + 5
 + 7 + 10 + 9 + 8 + 5 
 + 7 + 8 + 3 + 7 + 8 + 7
 + 8 + 3 + 6 + 4 + 11 + 8
 + 9 + 7 + 4 + 9 + 9 + 5
 + 9 + 9 + 11 + 4 + 13 + 4
 + 4 + 6 + 9 + 13 + 6 + 7
 + 8 + 8 + 4 + 7 + 10 + 10
 + 5 
 + 5 + 4 + 2 + 7 + 7 + 4
 + 4 + 4 + 5 + 6 + 9 + 3
 + 9 + 6 + 9 + 3 + 9 + 4
 + 6 + 15 + 6 + 4 + 10 + 5
 + 7 + 5 + 6 + 5 + 8 + 6
 + 7 + 5 + 5 + 11 + 8 + 5
 + 12 + 9 + 5 + 3 + 5 + 11
 + 5 + 4 + 7 + 6 + 2 + 6
 + 6 + 11 + 2 + 9 + 9 + 7 
 + 8 + 6 + 7 + 8 + 8 + 6
 + 9 + 12 + 8 + 7 + 11 + 5
 + 9 + 5 + 9 + 10 + 11 + 7
 + 10 + 8 + 8 + 7 + 6 + 6
}}
| top point scorer   =  Shane O'Leary(Nottingham)186 points
| top try scorer     =  Dean Adamson(Bedford Blues)16 tries
| prevseason         = 2017–18
| nextseason         = 2019–20
}}

The 2018–19 RFU Championship, known for sponsorship reasons as the Greene King IPA Championship, is the tenth season of the professionalised format of the RFU Championship, the second tier of the English rugby union league system run by the Rugby Football Union. It is contested by eleven English clubs and one from Jersey in the Channel Islands. The competition is sponsored by Greene King for a sixth successive season.  Clubs in the league also competed in the inaugural RFU Championship Cup. 

On 19 April 2019 London Irish were declared champions with a round to go, following an emphatic win away against struggling Richmond, claiming promotion back to the Premiership for the 2019–20 season, in what was their second Championship title in three seasons.  The next day (20 April), Richmond were relegated following relegation rivals Hartpury's victory at home against London Scottish.  Richmond would drop to the 2019–20 National League 1.

Coventry had the best campaign of a promoted club since the Championship's inception back in 2009–10 (regular season only), amassing 51 points on way to an 8th place finish - surpassing London Scottish's 45 point, 8th place finish back in 2011–12.

Structure
The Championship's structure has all the teams playing each other on a home and away basis. The first placed team in the competition is promoted to the Premiership; providing that club's ground fulfills the Rugby Football Union's Minimum Standards Criteria while the bottom side is relegated to National League 1. As part of an agreement with the RFU, each club will receive £530,000 funding. The British and Irish Cup, which the RFU Championship clubs played in with Welsh and Irish clubs, was scrapped due to the Championship clubs withdrawing and is to be replaced by a new cup competition – the RFU Championship Cup.

Teams
On 24 March 2018 Rotherham Titans were relegated with three games to go, after losing away to Jersey Reds. Despite seeing some improvements in the second half of the season, the Yorkshire club were easily the weakest side in the division, dropping to 2018–19 National League 1, the lowest level the club have played for fourteen seasons. Promoted in their place were the winners of 2017–18 National League 1, Coventry, who return to the second tier for the first time since being relegated at the end of the 2009–10 season.

On 7 April 2018 Bristol were crowned champions of the 2017–18 season with two games to go following title rivals Ealing Trailfinders defeat that day to Doncaster Knights. They were therefore promoted to Premiership Rugby. In winning the championship Bristol also became the most decorated tier 2 side in English league history with four league titles to-date. They are replaced by London Irish who return to the Championship after just one year in the Premiership.

Table

Fixtures & Results
Fixtures for the season were announced by the RFU on 22 June 2018.

Round 1

Round 2

Round 3

Postponed.  Game to be rescheduled for 3 November 2018.

Round 4

Round 5

Round 6

Round 7

Round 8

Round 9

Round 3 (rescheduled game)

Game rescheduled from 16 September 2018.

Round 10

Round 11

Round 12

Round 13

Round 14

Round 15

Round 16

Round 17

Round 18

Round 19

Round 20

Round 21

London Irish are champions.  Richmond are relegated following Hartpury's victory on 20 April.

Round 22

Attendances

Individual statistics
 Note that points scorers includes tries as well as conversions, penalties and drop goals. Appearance figures also include coming on as substitutes (unused substitutes not included).

Top points scorers

Top try scorers

Season records

Team
Largest home win — 67 points
72 – 5 London Irish at home to Yorkshire Carnegie on 13 October 2018
Largest away win — 41 points
61 – 20 Ealing Trailfinders away to Coventry on 23 March 2019
Most points scored — 72 points
72 – 5 London Irish at home to Yorkshire Carnegie on 13 October 2018	
Most tries in a match — 12
London Irish at home to Yorkshire Carnegie on 13 October 2018
Most conversions in a match — 8
Ealing Trailfinders away to Coventry on 23 March 2019
Most penalties in a match — 5 (2)
Nottingham at home to Doncaster Knights on 29 September 2018
Coventry away to Nottingham on 23 December 2018
Most drop goals in a match — 1 (5)
Hartpury College away to Doncaster Knights on 8 September 2018
Jersey Reds at home to Cornish Pirates on 13 October 2018
Nottingham away to Richmond on 20 October 2018
Nottingham at home to Ealing Trailfinders on 26 October 2018
Nottingham away to Coventry on 13 April 2019

Attendances
Highest — 10,106
London Irish at home to Doncaster Knights on 23 March 2019
Lowest — 602
Richmond at home to Hartpury College on 29 September 2018
Highest average attendance — 3,770
London Irish
Lowest average attendance — 977
Hartpury College

Player
Most points in a match — 24
 Dougie Flockhart for Doncaster Knights at home to Richmond on 26 January 2019
Most tries in a match — 4 
 Robin Wedlake for Cornish Pirates away to Hartpury College on 15 September 2018
Most conversions in a match — 8
 Craig Willis for Ealing Trailfinders away to Coventry on 23 March 2019
Most penalties in a match — 5
 Shane O'Leary for Nottingham at home to Doncaster Knights on 29 September 2018
 Will Maisey for Coventry away to Nottingham on 23 December 2018
Most drop goals in a match — 1 (5)
 Luke Cozens for Hartpury College away to Doncaster Knights on 8 September 2018
 Aaron Penberthy for Jersey Reds at home to Cornish Pirates on 13 October 2018
 Shane O'Leary for Nottingham away to Richmond on 20 October 2018
 Shane O'Leary for Nottingham at home to Ealing Trailfinders on 26 October 2018
 Shane O'Leary for Nottingham away to Coventry on 13 April 2019

Notes

References

 
2
2018–19